The WHO Model List of Essential Medicines for Children (aka Essential Medicines List for Children or EMLc), published by the World Health Organization (WHO), contains the medications considered to be most effective and safe in children up to twelve years of age to meet the most important needs in a health system.

The list is divided into core items and complementary items. The core items are deemed to be the most cost-effective options for key health problems and are usable with little additional health care resources. The complementary items either require additional infrastructure such as specially trained health care providers or diagnostic equipment or have a lower cost–benefit ratio.

The first list for children was created in 2007, and the list is in its 8th edition .

Note: An α indicates a medicine is only on the complementary list.

Anaesthetics, preoperative medicines and medical gases

General anaesthetics and oxygen

Inhalational medicines
 Halothane
 Isoflurane
 Nitrous oxide
 Oxygen

Injectable medicines
 Ketamine
 Propofol

Local anaesthetics
 Bupivacaine
 Lidocaine
 Lidocaine/epinephrine (lidocaine + epinephrine)

Preoperative medication and sedation for short-term procedures
 Atropine
 Midazolam
 Morphine

Medical gases
 Oxygen

Medicines for pain and palliative care

Non-opioids and non-steroidal anti-inflammatory medicines (NSAIMs)
 Ibuprofen
 Paracetamol (acetaminophen)

Opioid analgesics
 Morphine
 Methadone

Medicines for other symptoms common in palliative care
 Amitriptyline
 Cyclizine
 Dexamethasone
 Diazepam
 Docusate sodium
 Fluoxetine
 Hyoscine hydrobromide
 Lactulose
 Midazolam
 Ondansetron
 Senna

Antiallergics and medicines used in anaphylaxis
 Dexamethasone
 Epinephrine (adrenaline)
 Hydrocortisone
 Loratadine
 Prednisolone

Antidotes and other substances used in poisonings

Non-specific
 Charcoal, activated

Specific
 Acetylcysteine
 Atropine
 Calcium gluconate
 Naloxone
 Deferoxamine
 Dimercaprol
 Fomepizole
 Sodium calcium edetate
 Succimer

Anticonvulsants/antiepileptics
 Carbamazepine
 Diazepam
 Lamotrigine
 Lorazepam
 Midazolam
 Phenobarbital
 Phenytoin
 Valproic acid (sodium valproate)
 Ethosuximide
 Valproic acid (sodium valproate)

Anti-infective medicines

Anthelminthics

Intestinal anthelminthics

 Albendazole
 Ivermectin
 Levamisole
 Mebendazole
 Niclosamide
 Praziquantel
 Pyrantel

Antifilarials
 Albendazole
 Diethylcarbamazine
 Ivermectin

Antischistosomals and other antinematode medicines
 Praziquantel
 Triclabendazole
 Oxamniquine

Cysticidal medicines
 Albendazole
 Mebendazole
 Praziquantel

Antibacterials

Access group antibiotics
 Amikacin
 Amoxicillin
 Amoxicillin/clavulanic acid (amoxicillin + clavulanic acid)
 Ampicillin
 Benzathine benzylpenicillin
 Benzylpenicillin
 Cefalexin
 Cefazolin
 Chloramphenicol
 Clindamycin
 Cloxacillin
 Doxycycline
 Gentamicin
 Metronidazole
 Nitrofurantoin
 Phenoxymethylpenicillin (penicillin V)
 Procaine benzylpenicillin
 Sulfamethoxazole/trimethoprim (sulfamethoxazole + trimethoprim)
 Trimethoprim

Watch group antibiotics
 Azithromycin
 Cefixime
 Cefotaxime
 Ceftriaxone
 Cefuroxime
 Ciprofloxacin
 Clarithromycin
 Piperacillin/tazobactam (piperacillin + tazobactam)
 Vancomycin
 Ceftazidime
 Meropenem
 Vancomycin

Reserve group antibiotics
Reserve antibiotics are last-resort antibiotics. The EML antibiotic book was published in 2022.

 Ceftazidime/avibactam (ceftazidime + avibactam)
 Colistin
 Fosfomycin
 Linezolid
 Polymyxin B

Antileprosy medicines
 Clofazimine
 Dapsone
 Rifampicin

Antituberculosis medicines

 Ethambutol
 Isoniazid
 Isoniazid/pyrazinamide/rifampicin (isoniazid + pyrazinamide + rifampicin)
 Isoniazid/rifampicin (isoniazid + rifampicin)
 Isoniazid/rifapentine (isoniazid + rifapentine)
 Pyrazinamide
 Rifampicin
 Rifapentine
 Amikacin
 Amoxicillin/clavulanic acid (amoxicillin + clavulanic acid)
 Bedaquiline
 Clofazimine
 Cycloserine
 Delamanid
 Ethionamide
 Levofloxacin
 Linezolid
 Meropenem
 Moxifloxacin
 P-aminosalicylic acid
 Streptomycin

Antifungal medicines
 Amphotericin B
 Fluconazole
 Flucytosine
 Griseofulvin
 Itraconazole
 Nystatin
 Voriconazole
 Micafungin
 Potassium iodide

Antiviral medicines

Antiherpes medicines
 Aciclovir

Antiretrovirals

Nucleoside/nucleotide reverse transcriptase inhibitors
 Lamivudine
 Zidovudine

Non-nucleoside reverse transcriptase inhibitors
 Nevirapine

Protease inhibitors
 Darunavir
 Lopinavir/ritonavir (lopinavir + ritonavir)
 Ritonavir

Integrase inhibitors
 Dolutegravir
 Raltegravir

Fixed-dose combinations of antiretroviral medicines 
 Abacavir/lamivudine (abacavir + lamivudine)
 Lamivudine/zidovudine (lamivudine + zidovudine)

Medicines for prevention of HIV-related opportunistic infections
 Isoniazid/pyridoxine/sulfamethoxazole/trimethoprim (isoniazid + pyridoxine + sulfamethoxazole + trimethoprim)

Other antivirals
 Ribavirin
 Oseltamivir
 Valganciclovir

Antihepatitis medicines

Medicines for hepatitis B

Nucleoside/Nucleotide reverse transcriptase inhibitors
 Entecavir

Medicines for hepatitis C

Pangenotypic direct-acting antiviral combinations
 Daclatasvir
 Daclatasvir/sofosbuvir (daclatasvir + sofosbuvir)
 Glecaprevir/pibrentasvir (glecaprevir + pibrentasvir)
 Sofosbuvir
 Sofosbuvir/velpatasvir (sofosbuvir + velpatasvir)

Non-pangenotypic direct-acting antiviral combinations
No listings in this section.

Other antivirals for hepatitis C
No listings in this section.

Antiprotozoal medicines

Antiamoebic and antigiardiasis medicines
 Diloxanide
 Metronidazole

Antileishmaniasis medicines
 Amphotericin B
 Miltefosine
 Paromomycin
 Sodium stibogluconate or meglumine antimoniate

Antimalarial medicines

For curative treatment
 Amodiaquine
 Artemether
 Artemether/lumefantrine (artemether + lumefantrine)
 Artesunate
 Artesunate/amodiaquine (artesunate + amodiaquine)
 Artesunate/mefloquine (artesunate + mefloquine)
 Artesunate/pyronaridine tetraphosphate (artesunate + pyronaridine tetraphosphate)
 Chloroquine
 Dihydroartemisinin/piperaquine phosphate (dihydroartemisinin + piperaquine phosphate)
 Doxycycline
 Mefloquine
 Primaquine
 Quinine
 Sulfadoxine/pyrimethamine (sulfadoxine + pyrimethamine)

For chemoprevention
 Amodiaquine + sulfadoxine/pyrimethamine (Co-packaged)
 Chloroquine
 Doxycycline
 Mefloquine
 Proguanil
 Sulfadoxine/pyrimethamine (sulfadoxine + pyrimethamine)

Antipneumocystosis and antitoxoplasmosis medicines
 Pyrimethamine
 Sulfadiazine
 Sulfamethoxazole/trimethoprim (sulfamethoxazole + trimethoprim)

Antitrypanosomal medicines

African trypanosomiasis
 Fexinidazole

1st stage
 Pentamidine
 Suramin sodium

2nd stage
 Eflornithine
 Nifurtimox
 Melarsoprol

American trypanosomiasis
 Benznidazole
 Nifurtimox

Medicines for ectoparasitic infections
 Ivermectin

Antimigraine medicines

For treatment of acute attack
 Ibuprofen
 Paracetamol

For prophylaxis
 Propranolol

Immunomodulators and Antineoplastics

Immunomodulators for non-malignant disease
 Adalimumab
 Azathioprine
 Ciclosporin
 Tacrolimus

Antineoplastic and supportive medicines

Cytotoxic medicines 
 Arsenic trioxide
 Asparaginase
 Bleomycin
 Calcium folinate
 Carboplatin
 Cisplatin
 Cyclophosphamide
 Cytarabine
 Dacarbazine
 Dactinomycin
 Daunorubicin
 Doxorubicin
 Etoposide
 Fluorouracil
 Hydroxycarbamide
 Ifosfamide
 Irinotecan
 Mercaptopurine
 Methotrexate
 Oxaliplatin
 Paclitaxel
 Pegaspargase
 Procarbazine
 Realgar/Indigo naturalis
 Tioguanine
 Vinblastine
 Vincristine
 Vinorelbine

Targeted therapies
 All-trans retinoid acid (ATRA)
 Dasatinib
 Everolimus
 Imatinib
 Nilotinib
 Rituximab

Immunomodulators
 Filgrastim

Hormones and antihormones
 Dexamethasone
 Hydrocortisone
 Methylprednisolone
 Prednisolone

Supportive medicines
 Allopurinol
 Mesna
 Rasburicase

Medicines affecting the blood

Antianaemia medicines
 Ferrous salt
 Folic acid
 Hydroxocobalamin
 Erythropoiesis-stimulating agents

Medicines affecting coagulation
 Enoxaparin
 Phytomenadione
 Desmopressin
 Heparin sodium
 Protamine sulfate
 Warfarin

Other medicines for haemoglobinopathies
 Deferoxamine
 Hydroxycarbamide

Blood products of human origin and plasma substitutes

Blood and blood components

 Fresh frozen plasma
 Platelets
 Red blood cells
 Whole blood

Plasma-derived medicines

Human immunoglobulins
 Anti-rabies immunoglobulin
 Anti-tetanus immunoglobulin
 Normal immunoglobulin

Blood coagulation factors
 Coagulation factor VIII
 Coagulation factor IX

Plasma substitutes
 Dextran 70

Cardiovascular medicines

Antianginal medicines
No listings in this section.

Antiarrhythmic medicines
No listings in this section.

Antihypertensive medicines
 Enalapril

Medicines used in heart failure
 Digoxin
 Furosemide
 Dopamine

Antithrombotic medicines
No listings in this section.

Lipid-lowering agents
No listings in this section.

Dermatological medicines (topical)

Antifungal medicines
 Miconazole
 Terbinafine

Anti-infective medicines
 Mupirocin
 Potassium permanganate
 Silver sulfadiazine

Anti-inflammatory and antipruritic medicines
 Betamethasone
 Calamine
 Hydrocortisone

Medicines affecting skin differentiation and proliferation
 Benzoyl peroxide
 Calcipotriol
 Coal tar
 Podophyllum resin
 Salicylic acid
 Urea

Scabicides and pediculicides
 Benzyl benzoate
 Permethrin

Diagnostic agents

Ophthalmic medicines
 Fluorescein
 Tropicamide

Radiocontrast media
 Barium sulfate

Disinfectants and antiseptics

Antiseptics
 Chlorhexidine
 Ethanol
 Povidone iodine

Disinfectants
 Alcohol based hand rub
 Chlorine base compound
 Chloroxylenol
 Glutaral

Diuretics
 Furosemide
 Hydrochlorothiazide
 Mannitol
 Spironolactone

Gastrointestinal medicines
 Pancreatic enzymes

Antiulcer medicines
 Omeprazole
 Ranitidine

Antiemetic medicines
 Dexamethasone
 Metoclopramide
 Ondansetron
 Aprepitant

Anti-inflammatory medicines
No listings in this section.

Laxatives
No listings in this section.

Medicines used in diarrhoea
 Oral rehydration salts + zinc sulfate (Co-packaged)

Oral rehydration
 Oral rehydration salts

Medicines for diarrhoea
 Zinc sulfate

Medicines for endocrine disorders

Adrenal hormones and synthetic substitutes
 Fludrocortisone
 Hydrocortisone

Androgens
No listings in this section.

Estrogens
No listings in this section.

Progestogens
No listings in this section.

Medicines for diabetes

Insulins
 Insulin injection (soluble)
 Intermediate-acting insulin
 Long-acting insulin analogues

Oral hypoglycaemic agents
 Metformin

Medicines for hypoglycaemia
 Glucagon
 Diazoxide

Thyroid hormones and antithyroid medicines
 Levothyroxine
 Lugol's solution
 Methimazole
 Potassium iodide
 Propylthiouracil

Immunologicals

Diagnostic agents
 Tuberculin, purified protein derivative (PPD)

Sera and immunoglobulins
 Anti-rabies virus monoclonal antibodies
 Antivenom immunoglobulin
 Diphtheria antitoxin
 Equine rabies immunoglobulin

Vaccines
Recommendations for all
 BCG vaccine
 Diphtheria vaccine
 Haemophilus influenzae type b vaccine
 Hepatitis B vaccine
 HPV vaccine
 Measles vaccine
 Pertussis vaccine
 Pneumococcal vaccine
 Poliomyelitis vaccine
 Rotavirus vaccine
 Rubella vaccine
 Tetanus vaccine

Recommendations for certain regions
 Japanese encephalitis vaccine
 Yellow fever vaccine
 Tick-borne encephalitis vaccine

Recommendations for some high-risk populations
 Cholera vaccine
 Dengue vaccine
 Hepatitis A vaccine
 Meningococcal meningitis vaccine
 Rabies vaccine
 Typhoid vaccine

Recommendations for immunization programmes with certain characteristics
 Influenza vaccine
 Mumps vaccine
 Varicella vaccine

Muscle relaxants (peripherally-acting) and cholinesterase inhibitors
 Neostigmine
 Suxamethonium
 Vecuronium
 Pyridostigmine

Ophthalmological preparations

Anti-infective agents
 Aciclovir
 Azithromycin
 Erythromycin
 Gentamicin
 Natamycin
 Ofloxacin
 Tetracycline

Anti-inflammatory agents
 Prednisolone

Local anaesthetics
 Tetracaine

Miotics and antiglaucoma medicines
No listings in this section.

Mydriatics
 Atropine
 Epinephrine (adrenaline)

Anti-vascular endothelial growth factor (VEGF) preparations
No listings in this section.

Medicines for reproductive health and perinatal care

Contraceptives
No listings in this section.

Ovulation inducers
No listings in this section.

Uterotonics
No listings in this section.

Antioxytocics (tocolytics)
No listings in this section.

Other medicines administered to the mother
No listings in this section.

Medicines administered to the neonate
 Caffeine citrate
 Chlorhexidine
 Ibuprofen
 Prostaglandin E1
 Surfactant

Peritoneal dialysis solution
 Intraperitoneal dialysis solution (of appropriate composition)

Medicines for mental and behavioural disorders

Medicines used in psychotic disorders
 Chlorpromazine
 Haloperidol

Medicines used in mood disorders

Medicines used in depressive disorders
 Fluoxetine

Medicines used in bipolar disorders
No listings in this section.

Medicines for anxiety disorders
No listings in this section.

Medicines used for obsessive compulsive disorders
No listings in this section.

Medicines for disorders due to psychoactive substance use
No listings in this section.

Medicines acting on the respiratory tract

Antiasthmatic medicines
 Budesonide
 Epinephrine (adrenaline)
 Salbutamol (albuterol)

Solutions correcting water, electrolyte and acid-base disturbances

Oral
 Oral rehydration salts
 Potassium chloride

Parenteral
 Glucose
 Glucose with sodium chloride
 Potassium chloride
 Sodium chloride
 Sodium hydrogen carbonate
 Sodium lactate, compound solution

Miscellaneous
 Water for injection

Vitamins and minerals
 Ascorbic acid
 Cholecalciferol
 Iodine
 Multiple micronutrient powder
 Pyridoxine
 Retinol
 Riboflavin
 Thiamine
 Calcium gluconate

Ear, nose and throat medicines
 Acetic acid
 Budesonide
 Ciprofloxacin
 Xylometazoline

Medicines for diseases of joints

Medicines used to treat gout
No listings in this section.

Disease-modifying agents used in rheumatoid disorders
 Hydroxychloroquine
 Methotrexate

Juvenile joint diseases
 Aspirin

Dental preparations
 Fluoride
 Glass ionomer cement
 Silver diamine fluoride

Notes

References

Further reading

External links 

Children
2007 introductions
Drug-related lists